Kaliganj massacre refers to the massacre of over 400 unarmed Bengali Hindus in East Pakistan fleeing to India in Kaliganj market, in the present day Jaldhaka Upazila of Nilphamari District on 27 April 1971. An estimated 400 Bengali Hindus were killed by the occupying Pakistan Army. It is alleged that this massacre was masterminded by Muslim League leader and central minister Kazi Abdul Kader.

Background 
In 1971, Kaliganj market fell under Jaldhaka police station of Nilphamari sub-division of the erstwhile greater Rangpur district. Now, known as the Bangabandhu market, it falls under the Golna Union of Jaldhaka Upazila of Nilphamari District in Rangpur Division. The Bangabandhu market is situated 9 km to the north west of Jaldhaka Upazila headquarters.

Killings 
In 1971, when the Pakistan army launched a genocidal campaign in Bangladesh, the Bengali Hindus of the area began to flee to India. On 27 April, more than a thousand Bengali Hindus of different unions of the present day Jaldhaka Upazila took refuge in Kaliganj market. Some of them left towards India. At around 10am, an estimated 300 Bengali Hindu men, women and children from Balagram Union arrived in Kaliganj market.

Around the same time a contingent of the Pakistan army arrived in Kaliganj market in four convoys. Before the stranded Bengali Hindu refugees could understand anything, they were sprayed with bullets. According to survivor Amar Krishna Adhikari, a Pakistani major separated the refugees into two groups. One group was taken to the nearby canal where they were shot dead. The rest were shot on the spot. The wounded were buried alive along with those who died on the spot.

Aftermath 
In 1999, a memorial was built in the memory of the victims.

References 

1971 Bangladesh genocide
Massacres of Bengali Hindus in East Pakistan
1971 in Bangladesh
Persecution of Hindus
Persecution by Muslims
Massacres in 1971
Nilphamari District
Massacres committed by Pakistan in East Pakistan
April 1971 events in Bangladesh